The 1986 Nabisco Grand Prix was the only tennis circuit held that year. The tour consisted of 70 tournaments in 23 different countries. It incorporated three of the four grand slam tournaments, three World Championship Tennis tournaments and the Grand Prix tournaments. The season ending Masters tournament was moved from the January slot to December.

Schedule 
The table below shows the schedule for the 1986 Nabisco Grand Prix season.

Key

January

February

March

April

May

June

July

August

September

October

November

December

ATP rankings

List of tournament winners 
The list of winners and number of singles titles won, alphabetically by last name:
  Vijay Amritraj (1) Bristol
  Boris Becker (6) Chicago, Wimbledon, Toronto, Sydney Indoor, Tokyo Indoor, Bercy
  Jay Berger (1) Buenos Aires
  Paolo Canè (1) Bordeaux
  Kent Carlsson (2) Bari, Barcelona
  Simone Colombo (1) St. Vincent
  Kevin Curren (1) Atlanta
  Stefan Edberg (3) Gstaad, Basel, Stockholm
  Guy Forget (1) Toulouse
  Brad Gilbert (4) Memphis, Livingston, Tel Aviv, Vienna
  Andrés Gómez (4) Indianapolis, Florence, Boston, Itaparica
  Martín Jaite (2) Bologna, Stuttgart Outdoor
  Anders Järryd (1) Dallas
  Ramesh Krishnan (2) Tokyo Outdoor, Hong Kong
  Henri Leconte (2) Geneva, Hamburg
  Ivan Lendl (10) Masters, Philadelphia, Boca West, Milan, French Open, Fort Myers, Rome, Stratton Mountain, US Open, Masters
  Amos Mansdorf (1) Johannesburg
  Tim Mayotte (1) Queen's Club
  John McEnroe (3) Los Angeles, San Francisco, Scottsdale
  Miloslav Mečíř (1) Kitzbühel
  Thomas Muster (1) Hilversum
  Yannick Noah (2) Forest Hills, Wembley
  Karel Nováček (1) Washington, D.C.
  Joakim Nyström (5) Toronto Indoor, La Quinta, Rotterdam, Monte Carlo, Madrid
  Emilio Sánchez (3) Nice, Munich, Båstad
  Bill Scanlon (1) Newport
  Ulf Stenlund (1) Palermo
  Henrik Sundström (1) Athens
  Jonas Svensson (1) Cologne
  Thierry Tulasne (1) Metz
  Mats Wilander (2) Brussels, Cincinnati
  Mark Woodforde (1) Auckland
  Slobodan Živojinović (1) Houston

The following players won their first title in 1986:
  Jay Berger Buenos Aires
  Paolo Canè Bordeaux
  Kent Carlsson Bari
  Simone Colombo St. Vincent
  Guy Forget Toulouse
  Amos Mansdorf Johannesburg
  Thomas Muster Hilversum
  Karel Nováček Washington, D.C.
  Emilio Sánchez Nice
  Ulf Stenlund Palermo
  Jonas Svensson Cologne
  Mark Woodforde Auckland
  Slobodan Živojinović Houston

See also 
 1986 Virginia Slims World Championship Series

Notes

References

External links 
 ATP Archive 1986: Nabisco Grand Prix Tournaments
 History Mens Professional Tours

Further reading 
 

 
Grand Prix
Grand Prix tennis circuit seasons